The Pittsburgh Pirates have completed 132 seasons in Major League Baseball (MLB) since joining the National League (NL) in 1887. Through 2018, they have played 20,256 regular season games, winning 10,240 and losing 10,016, for a winning percentage of .506. The Pirates are also a combined total of 43—53 (.448) in post-season play. Prior to joining the National League in 1887 the franchise compiled a record of 236—296 (.444) in five seasons of the American Association.

This list documents the season-by-season records of the Pirates’ franchise including their years as the “Alleghenies” (alternately spelled Alleghenys). The Pirates moved from the American Association to the National League after owner William Nimick became upset over a contract dispute, thus establishing the extant franchise. The team currently plays home games at PNC Park which they moved into in 2001. Prior to PNC Park, the Pirates played home games at Three Rivers Stadium and Forbes Field, among other stadiums.

In 1903, the Pirates were defeated by the Boston Americans in the first World Series. The Pirates returned to and won the World Series in 1909, over the Detroit Tigers. Since then the Pirates have won World Series in 1925, 1960, 1971, and 1979. In addition to these five World Series victories the Pirates have won nine National League pennants and qualified for the playoffs fifteen times, six of which were during a run of twelve winning seasons between 1969 and 1980.

The franchise's original colors were red and blue, which were switched to black and gold—colors that all professional Pittsburgh sports franchises now share—for the 1948 season.

Table key

Season by season

These statistics are current as of October 3, 2021.

Record by decade 
The following table describes the Pirates' MLB win–loss record by decade.

These statistics are from Baseball-Reference.com's Pittsburgh Pirates History & Encyclopedia, and are current as of January 16, 2018.

Postseason record by year
The Pirates have made the postseason seventeen times in their history, with their first being in 1903 and the most recent being in 2015.

Footnotes
 The 1972 Major League Baseball strike forced the cancellation of the first seven games (thirteen game-days) of the season.
 The 1981 Major League Baseball strike caused the season to split into two halves. This caused Major League Baseball to hold the Divisional Series so that the first- and second-half champions could play each other to determine playoff spots for the NLCS and World Series.
 The 1994–95 Major League Baseball strike  ended the season on August 11, as well as cancelling the entire postseason.
 The official Pirates website uses the spelling of "Alleghenies" rather than "Alleghenys".
 The Pirates first season at PNC Park.
 The 2020 Major League Baseball season was shortened to 60 games due to the COVID-19 global pandemic..

References
General

 
 
 
 

Notes

 
Major League Baseball teams seasons
Seasons